La plus que lente, L. 121 ("The more than slow"), is a waltz for solo piano written by Claude Debussy in 1910, shortly after his publication of the Préludes, Book I. The piece debuted at the New Carlton Hotel in Paris, where it was transcribed for strings and performed by the popular 'gipsy' violinist, Léoni, for whom Debussy wrote it (and who was given the manuscript by the composer).

Debussy arranged the piece for small orchestra (flute, clarinet, piano, cimbalom and strings) which was published in 1912.

Style
Despite its title, La plus que lente was not meant to be played slowly; "lente," in this context, refers to the valse lente genre that Debussy attempted to emulate. Typical of Debussy's caustic approach to naming his compositions, it represented his reaction to the vast influence of the slow waltz in France's social atmospheres. However, as Frank Howes noted, "La plus que lente is, in Debussy's wryly humorous way, the valse lente [slow waltz] to outdo all others."

The work is marked "Molto rubato con morbidezza," indicating Debussy's encouragement of a flexible tempo.

History
It has been claimed that Debussy was supposedly inspired for La plus que lente by a small sculpture, "La Valse", that he kept on his mantelpiece. However, others point to various sources of inspiration, some citing the resemblance between this waltz and Debussy's earlier work, Ballade.

During the same year of its composition, an orchestration of the work was conceived, but Debussy opposed the score's heavy use of percussion and proposed a new one, writing to his publisher:

See also
List of compositions by Claude Debussy by genre
List of compositions by Claude Debussy by Lesure numbers
Impressionist music
Romantic music

References

External links

Original solo-piano version at last.fm

Compositions by Claude Debussy
1910 compositions